Östgötaderbyt (lit. The Östergötland Derby) is the fixture between the two association football clubs IFK Norrköping and Åtvidabergs FF, it is a local derby in Östergötland, Sweden and a fierce rivalry. The derby is commonly known as Östgötaderbyt, although this is a generic term that could be used for any fixture between two clubs in Östergötland. The rivalry has arisen because the two clubs are the most successful clubs in Östergötland. The two clubs have also played most seasons in the top tier league Allsvenskan of all Östergötland clubs and they are also the two out of just three Östergötland clubs to have won the Swedish football championship, IFK Norrköping with 12 titles and Åtvidabergs FF with 2 titles. The majority of the matches between the two clubs have taken place in Allsvenskan, but fixtures have also taken place in Division 2 and Superettan. As of the 2017 season, IFK Norrköping are competing in Allsvenskan, and Åtvidabergs FF are in Superettan.

Matches

Åtvidaberg in the league at home

Norrköping in the league at home

Honours

References

External links
 Sveriges Fotbollshistoriker och Statistiker – Statistics for all Allsvenskan and Svenska Cupen matches
 IFK Norrköping official website
 Åtvidabergs FF official website

IFK Norrköping
Åtvidabergs FF
Football derbies in Sweden